Da Game Owe Me is the 1999 album by Playa Fly and the final album of his to be released on Super Sigg Records.

Track listing
 "Intro" – 2:52
 "Get Me Out" – 4:23
 "M3 II" – 4:42
 "Ghetto Eyes" – 4:53
 "Talkin' Cash" (Featuring Thaistik) – 6:02
 "Damn What Another Say" – 5:36
 "Breakin' Da Law" (Featuring Terror & Gangsta Blac) – 5:28
 "Skit (Luv 2 Hate Me)" – 1:21
 "Start Runnin'" – 4:45
 "Get' Em" (Featuring Blackout & Terror) – 6:56
 "Feel Me" – 5:14
 "Send for Me" – 5:25
 "N God We Trust" – 4:53
 "As-Salaam Aliakum" – 5:21

Personnel
Blackout – Producer
Gangsta Blac – Performer
Mista I-B-N – Producer, Production Assistant
Rusty – Engineer
Brandon "Wundabred" Seavers – Graphic Design
Van Siggers – Executive Producer

Playa Fly albums
1999 albums